This is a list of regions of Tanzania by GDP and GDP per capita. Data does only include values for Mainland Tansania without Zanzibar.

List of regions by GDP 
Regions (2011 borders) by GDP in 2018 according to data by the National Bureau of Statistics (Tanzania).

List of regions by GDP per capita 
Regions  (2011 borders) by GDP per capita in 2018 according to data by the National Bureau of Statistics (Tanzania).

See also 
Economy of Tanzania

References 

Tanzania
Tanzania
Economy of Tanzania